is a former Nippon Professional Baseball player.

In 1998, he attempted to win a roster spot with the Oakland Athletics of Major League Baseball.

References

External links

Living people
1960 births
Baseball people from Kitakyushu
Japanese baseball players
Nippon Professional Baseball infielders
Hankyu Braves players
Orix Braves players
Orix BlueWave players
Hanshin Tigers players
Fukuoka Daiei Hawks players